In Greek and Roman mythology, Evander (Ancient Greek: Εὔανδρος Euandros means "abounding in good men and true") may refer to three distinct characters:

 Evander, a Lycian king who succeeded his father Sarpedon, son of Zeus and Europa, in the kingship of Lycia. He married Deidamia, daughter of Bellerophon, and had by her a son Sarpedon.
 Evander, a Trojan prince as the bastard son of King Priam of Troy by an unknown concubine.
 Evander of Pallantium, the wisest among the Arcadians, emigrated to Italy where he founded a city Pallantium. He was the son of Hermes and Carmentis, a nymph skilled in the art of divination.

Notes

References 

 Apollodorus, The Library with an English Translation by Sir James George Frazer, F.B.A., F.R.S. in 2 Volumes, Cambridge, MA, Harvard University Press; London, William Heinemann Ltd. 1921. ISBN 0-674-99135-4. Online version at the Perseus Digital Library. Greek text available from the same website.
 Diodorus Siculus, The Library of History translated by Charles Henry Oldfather. Twelve volumes. Loeb Classical Library. Cambridge, Massachusetts: Harvard University Press; London: William Heinemann, Ltd. 1989. Vol. 3. Books 4.59–8. Online version at Bill Thayer's Web Site
 Diodorus Siculus, Bibliotheca Historica. Vol 1-2. Immanel Bekker. Ludwig Dindorf. Friedrich Vogel. in aedibus B. G. Teubneri. Leipzig. 1888-1890. Greek text available at the Perseus Digital Library.
 Gaius Julius Hyginus, Fabulae from The Myths of Hyginus translated and edited by Mary Grant. University of Kansas Publications in Humanistic Studies. Online version at the Topos Text Project.
 Pausanias, Description of Greece with an English Translation by W.H.S. Jones, Litt.D., and H.A. Ormerod, M.A., in 4 Volumes. Cambridge, MA, Harvard University Press; London, William Heinemann Ltd. 1918. . Online version at the Perseus Digital Library
 Pausanias, Graeciae Descriptio. 3 vols. Leipzig, Teubner. 1903.  Greek text available at the Perseus Digital Library.

Lycians
Trojans
Princes in Greek mythology
Arcadian mythology